Sir Harold Arthur Stuart  (29 July 1860 – 1 March 1923) was an Indian Civil Servant, the first Director of the Central Criminal Intelligence Department, and later a Home Secretary to the Government of India. A graduate of King's College, Cambridge, Harold Stuart was born in the city of York to Peter Stuart. He entered the Indian Civil Service in 1881, serving as the Under Secretary to the Government of Madras. From April 1904 till 1909, Stuart served as the head of the newly formed Central Criminal Intelligence Department, later serving as the Home Secretary to the Government of India and subsequently in the Executive Council.

In 1919 he was appointed as the British High commissioner to the Inter-Allied Rhineland High Commission

References

British police officers in India
Indian Civil Service (British India) officers
Revolutionary movement for Indian independence
Alumni of King's College, Cambridge
People from York
Knights Grand Cross of the Order of St Michael and St George
Knights Commander of the Order of the Star of India
Knights Commander of the Royal Victorian Order
1923 deaths
Inter-Allied Rhineland High Commission
1860 births